Sphaerolichidae is a mite family in the suborder Sphaerolichida.

References

External links 

Trombidiformes
Acari families